Styggehøe, Stygghøin, or Styggehøi is the name of several mountains in Norway:

 Store Styggehøe, a  mountain in Lom municipality in Innlandet county, Norway
 Styggehøi, a  mountain on the border of Vågå and Lom municipalities in Innlandet county, Norway
 Styggehøe, a  mountain on the border of Vågå and Nord-Fron municipalities in Innlandet county, Norway
 Styggehøi (Skjåk), a  mountain in Skjåk municipality in Innlandet county, Norway
 Stygghøin, a  mountain in Dovre municipality in Innlandet county, Norway